Iris is an opera in three acts by Pietro Mascagni to an original Italian libretto by Luigi Illica. It premiered on 22 November 1898 at the Teatro Costanzi in Rome. The story is set in Japan during legendary times.

Background and performance history
In common with all of Mascagni's full-length operas, Iris is now rarely performed, even in Italy, although along with L'amico Fritz it remains one of the composer's more performed operas. Two of the opera's most memorable numbers are the tenor's serenade ("Apri la tua finestra") and the Hymn to the Sun ("Inno al Sole").

The so-called "aria della piovra" ("Octopus aria"), "Un dì, ero piccina", where Iris describes a screen she had seen in a Buddhist temple when she was a child, depicting an octopus coiling its tentacles around a young woman, is a rare Western use of the popular Japanese tentacle erotica (shokushu goukan, 触手強姦, "tentacle violation") tradition, exemplified in the print The Dream of the Fisherman's Wife (1814) by Hokusai.

Roles

Synopsis

Act 1

The opera begins with an invisible choir singing a "Hymn to the Sun", the second best-known piece in the opera. However, it should be called "Hymn of the Sun", since it is sung by the sun itself (as a choir).

Iris, the young and innocent daughter of a blind old man, Il Cieco, lives happily, enjoying the sun and the simple things of nature. Osaka, a young lord in search of adventures, plans to kidnap her with the help of Kyoto who keeps a geisha house. During a puppet show, Osaka enters disguised as a child of the sun, singing the serenade "Apri la tua finestra [Open Your Window]", the most famous selection in the opera. He conquers the heart of Iris, and Samurai carry her off, conducting her to Kyoto's geisha house called Yoshiwara. Before leaving, Kyoto anonymously leaves money on Il Cieco's doorstep, as well as a note telling him where she has gone and implying that she has abandoned him.

Act 2

At Yoshiwara, where, according to the libretto, the sun never penetrates, Iris wakes up under the illusion of having died and gone to Paradise. Osaka arrives and tries to seduce her but fails to persuade her to yield to his advances. Tired and annoyed by her simplicity and innocence, Osaka tells Kyoto to get rid of her. Instead Kyoto, hoping to make some profit off Iris, exposes her to the crowds on a balcony of the house. Il Cieco, having assumed that Iris went to the geisha house of her own accord, comes there. He curses her, repeatedly flinging mud in her face. She is overwhelmed by sudden madness at her father's incomprehensible actions. Before anyone, including the remorse-stricken Osaka who has returned, can stop her, Iris rushes back into the house and throws herself down a shaft leading to a sewer.

Act 3

The next morning in the sewer, ragpickers begin stealing Iris' silken clothing; she revives, frightening away the ragpickers. She quickly becomes delirious and imagines that she hears the voices of the three men, first Osaka, then Kyoto, and finally Il Cieco, each mocking her. She rejoices when she feels the warm rays of the rising sun, accompanied by a return of the "Hymn to the Sun", and she dies. Tendrils of flowers bear the soul of Iris to heaven.

Instrumentation

References

Further reading
Warrack, John and West, Ewan (1992), The Oxford Dictionary of Opera, 782 pp.,

External links

Libretto (in Italian)
Opera Holland Park home page for their 2016 production

Operas
Italian-language operas
Operas by Pietro Mascagni
1898 operas
Operas set in Japan
Japan in non-Japanese culture